Diaz Rock is the largest of several rocks lying 1 km north by west of Raduil Point, the northwest end of Astrolabe Island, off Trinity Peninsula in Antarctica. The rock was surveyed from the ground and photographed from the air by FIDASE, 1955–57. The name was given by the first Chilean Antarctic Expedition (1947) for sub-lieutenant Joaquin Diaz Martinez.

Maps
 Trinity Peninsula. Scale 1:250000 topographic map No. 5697. Institut für Angewandte Geodäsie and British Antarctic Survey, 1996.
Antarctic Digital Database (ADD). Scale 1:250000 topographic map of Antarctica. Scientific Committee on Antarctic Research (SCAR). Since 1993, regularly upgraded and updated.

References
 Diaz Rock. SCAR Composite Antarctic Gazetteer.

Rock formations of the Trinity Peninsula
Astrolabe Island